LADbible Group, part of LBG Media, is a British digital publisher. Its headquarters are in Manchester and it has offices in London, Dublin, Sydney, Melbourne and Auckland.

Founded in 2012 by Alexander "Solly" Solomou and Arian Kalantari, LADbible Group produces digital content aimed at young adults, claiming to reach two-thirds of 18–34-year-olds in the UK.

Its brands include LADbible, UNILAD, GAMINGbible, SPORTbible and Tyla, among many others. They generate more than 28bn content views globally every year 

It has its own in-house creative team, Joyride, set up in 2016, who work with clients to help them reach LADbible Group's younger audience of 18-34 year olds through creative campaigns  and in 2021, launched its own in-house production arm, LADstudios, which focuses on factual entertainment programming as well as documentary content.

History 
Solomou developed the idea for a social media publishing business while at the University of Leeds, where he studied business management from 2009 to 2012. The Lad Bible Limited was founded on 3 April 2012 and developed into the LADbible project when director Arian Kalantari joined.

LADbible Group parent company was originally called The Lad Bible Limited, and changed its name to The Global Social Media Group Limited on 18 November 2013. On 19 June 2014, the parent company changed its name to 65TWENTY LTD then to Ladbible Group Limited on 16 November 2015.

The LADbible project started in January 2012 when the channel published their first Facebook post which achieved over 75,000 interactions. In 2014, LADbible's Facebook page had almost 2 million likes and was attracting over 5 million unique users every month. By November 2015 this number had increased more than 400% to 10.6 million followers on Facebook. This has continued to grow to more than 24.3 million followers in May 2017.

In 2016, LADbible Group, launched an in-house creative agency, Joyride, to offer advertising on their online platforms. 
 
In July 2017, Tubular Labs ranked LADbible as the No. 1 'Media & Entertainment Creator' in the world. In the same month, LADbible also achieved No. 3 globally in the Top Media & Entertainment Properties, ahead of Time Warner, Comcast and Sony.

In October 2018, LADbible Group took over social media rival UNILAD, making it the largest social video publisher ever 

In 2019, LADbible Group launched LADbible Australia, followed by SPORTbible Australia. In the same year, they launched LADbible Ireland, claiming to reach almost half of all Irish people each month, and were opening an office in Dublin to better service that audience 

In May 2021, LADbible Group launched LADbible New Zealand

Content and campaigns 
LADbible Group publishes original and acquired content, including editorial, video, and documentary material, some of which is broadcast live. Their content covers entertainment and celebrity interviews, as well as news and current affairs. They also run campaigns on subjects intended to interest a young market, such as mental health, the environment and political matters.

Original content 
LADbible Group have their own in-house production studios called LADstudios where they produce premium original content, including original show formats including 'Minutes with' and celebrity content, with A-list stars such as Will Smith and Tom Holland, like entertainment productions 'Snack Wars'  and 'Shocking Answers". They have also recently began making content for partners, including the UNHEARD six-part documentary series for Amazon Prime Video which focuses on critical issues of racial discrimination in Australia, including Indigenous deaths in custody, the targeting of Indigenous youth, attacks towards Asians during the COVID-19 pandemic, Islamophobia, the vilification of the African community and the treatment of asylum seekers and refugees

European Union membership referendum 
In the run up to the 2016 United Kingdom European Union membership referendum, LADbible launched an awareness campaign to encourage their youth audience to exercise the vote. The publisher spent three months producing stories and short explainers on the vote which linked directly to the government's register-to-vote page. The 45,000 clicks attracted by the campaign accounted for 20% of all traffic to their sites during this period.

Mental health 
LADbible first launched their mental health campaign in 2016 with a dedicated UOKM8? website hub. Supported by charities including CALM, the campaign included a video series called 'Everyday Heroes' that featured a number of high-profile men including Olympian Louis Smith, and addressed their struggles with anxiety and depression. UOKM8? was recognised by the industry by winning awards including: Drum DADI, Masters of Marketing, Lovies and Webby. The campaign as a whole, reached in excess of 36 million and received over 4.8 million video views. UOKM8? was relaunched in 2018 with a shifted focus towards helping others suffering with mental health problems.
In 2020, LADbible Group relaunched UOKM8? across its five major brands, LADbible, UNILAD, GAMINGbible, SPORTbible and Tyla during the UK's third lockdown as the company recognised readers were “suffering” under continued restrictive measures and in particular after the government's reversal of relaxation of rules for the Christmas period.

Plastic pollution 
LADbible's biggest awareness campaign to date, 'Trash Isles', was designed to highlight the global problem of plastic pollution in oceans. Featuring high-profile climate activists including Sir David Attenborough, Dame Judi Dench and Al Gore, the publisher approached the United Nations to declare an accumulation of plastic in the Pacific Ocean, as an official country, encouraging people to sign up to be a citizen. Trash Isles was identified by The Drum as one of the most awarded media campaigns of 2018, picking up accolades across the industry including eight Cannes Lions awards including two Grand Prix.

Blood donation restrictions 
UNILAD launched 'Blood Without Bias' in November 2019 to campaign for a fairer blood donation system, and raise awareness for the fact that gay and bisexual men were still prohibited from donating blood by UK law unless they are willing to abstain from sex for three months. The campaign included the launch of the world's first blood bank for gay and bisexual men called 'The Illegal Blood Bank', where qualified medical professionals were on hand to assess donors, based on their broader sexual behaviour, and test the blood, in an effort to underline how much blood was potentially going to waste due to the law. UNILAD also shared content across its channels and started a petition on Change.org to demand that risk be assessed based on individual sexual behaviour, not sexual orientation alone.

The campaign has nearly 1 million video views worldwide, achieved 10.8 million impressions online and in June 2021 the NHS revised its guidelines, opening blood donation up to anyone who has had the same sexual partner for three months or more. The campaign also won three awards at Cannes Lions 2021.

Awards 
In November 2015, LADbible featured in Manchester Evening News for winning two awards at the Digital Entrepreneur Awards ceremony. LADbible won the Social Media Campaign of the Year (medium/large) and founder, Alexander Solomou, won the Young Digital Entrepreneur of The Year award.

In June 2018, LADbible's "Trash Isles" campaign won eight Cannes Lions Awards at the Cannes Lions International Festival of Creativity. The campaign won two Grand Prix awards as well as a further two Gold, one Silver and three Bronze

See also
 SPORTbible
 UNILAD

References

External links 
 

Mass media about Internet culture
Internet properties established in 2012
Mass media companies of the United Kingdom
Online companies of the United Kingdom
Companies based in Manchester